Kompakt: Total 5 or Total 5 was released on 22 July 2003. The album is the fifth installment of the influential Cologne-based microhouse label's annual compilation of vinyl releases and exclusives from its biggest artists and most promising newcomers. All tracks on the vinyl edition are previously unreleased. Five songs appear on both the vinyl and CD formats.

Track listing : Vinyl Edition 
A1 Superpitcher – "Mushroom"

A2 T.Raumschmiere – "Total"

B1 Thomas Fehlmann – "Radeln"

B2 Joachim Spieth – "Nie Mehr Allein"

C1 Reinhard Voigt – "Liebe Deine Musik"

C2 M. Mayer/Reinhard Voigt – "Criticize"

D1 The Modernist – "Indigo"

D2 Heib – "Entdeckung Der Langsamkeit"

Tracks C2, D1 and D2  are exclusive to vinyl version.

Track listing : CD Edition 
 SCSI-9 – "All She Wants Is" (7:06)
 Superpitcher – "Mushroom" (6:32)
 Phong Sui – "Wintermute (Burger/Voigt Mix)" (4:37)
 Justus Köhncke – "Homogen" (6:17)
 T.Raumschmiere – "Total" (5:36)
 Reinhard Voigt – "Liebe Deine Musik" (4:47)
 M. Mayer – "Speaker" (6:43)
 Joachim Spieth – "Nie Mehr Allein" (6:42)
 Thomas Fehlmann – "Radeln" (5:51)
 Mikkel Metal – "Nepal" (7:11)
 Jonas Bering – "Normandie 2" (7:36)

Six of the tracks on the CD are taken from previously released 12 inch vinyls originally released on Kompakt (catalogue number in parentheses): #1 (KOM81); #3 (KOMPOP2); #4 (KOM77); #7 (KOM70); #10 (KOM84); #11 (KOM79).

External links

2003 compilation albums
Techno compilation albums
Microhouse albums
Record label compilation albums
Kompakt compilation albums